Walnut Creek is a  tributary of Lake Erie in Erie County, Pennsylvania in the United States.

See also 
 List of rivers of Pennsylvania

References 

Tributaries of Lake Erie
Rivers of Pennsylvania
Rivers of Erie County, Pennsylvania